Fofanah may refer to:
Abu Bakarr Fofanah, Sierra Leonean politician
Alusine Fofanah, Sierra Leonean politician
Alusine Fofanah (footballer) (born 1997), Sierra Leonean footballer
Fatmata Fofanah (born 1985), Guinean footballer
Ibrahim Fofanah (born 1994), Sierra Leonean footballer
Isatu Fofanah (politician) (born 1958), Sierra Leonean politician
Isatu Fofanah (athlete) (born 1993), Canadian sprinter
Nabie Foday Fofanah (born 1980), Guinean sprinter